Karahasan can refer to:

 Karahasan, Aşkale
 Karahasan, Ulus

See also
 Carahasani, a village in Ștefan Vodă District, Moldova